Bank Building, also known as Old Mercantile Building and Eastern Shore Chamber of Commerce, is a historical commercial building located at Accomac, Virginia, Accomack County, Virginia. It was built about 1820, and it is a two-story, rectangular brick structure in the Federal style.  The front facade and watertable are stuccoed.  It has a gable roof and features a fanlight window above the second story door.

It was added to the National Register of Historic Places in 1974.

References

Commercial buildings on the National Register of Historic Places in Virginia
Federal architecture in Virginia
Commercial buildings completed in 1820
National Register of Historic Places in Accomack County, Virginia
1820 establishments in Virginia